Aqdash-e Sofla (also Romanized as Āqdāsh-e Soflá; also known as Āq Dāsh) is a village in Pain Barzand Rural District, Anguti District, Germi County, Ardabil Province, Iran. At the 2006 census, its population was 168, in 31 families.

References 

Towns and villages in Germi County